Hilgermissen is a municipality in the district of Nienburg, in Lower Saxony, Germany.

It is distinguished by the fact that local streets are not named. Instead addresses are given as a house number plus the village name and postal code. In a local referendum in February 2019, 60 percent of voters rejected a proposal to introduce street names.

References

Nienburg (district)